A spaghetti bridge is a bridge (architectural model) made of uncooked spaghetti or other hard, dry, straight noodles. Bridges are constructed for both educational experiments and competitions. The aim is usually to construct a bridge with a specific quantity of materials over a specific span, that can sustain a load. In competitions, the bridge that can hold the greatest load for a short period of time wins the contest. There are many contests around the world, usually held by schools and colleges.

Okanagan College contest

The original Spaghetti Bridge competition has run at Okanagan College in British Columbia since 1983, and is open to international entrants who are full-time secondary or post-secondary students.

The winners of the 2009 competition were Norbert Pozsonyi and Aliz Totivan of the Szechenyi Istvan University of Győr in Hungary. They won $1,500 with a bridge that weighed 982 grams and held 443.58 kg. Second place went to Brendon Syryda and Tyler Pearson of Okanagan College with a bridge that weighed 982 grams and held 98.71 kg.

Contests
Spaghetti bridge building contests around the world include:
 Abbotsford School District
 Australian Maritime College
 Budapest Technical University
 Camosun College
 Coonabarabran High School
 Delft University of Technology
 Ferris State University
 George Brown College
 Institute of Machine Design and Security Technology
 Instituto GayLussac - Ensino Fundamental e Médio
 Universidade da Coruña, Escola Politécnica de Enxeñaría
 Italy High School
 James Cook University
 Johns Hopkins University
 McGill University
 Monash University
 Nathan Hale High School
 Okanagan College
 Riga Technical University
 Rowan University
 Technical University of Madrid
Universidad del Valle de Guatemala
 Universidade Federal do Rio Grande do Sul
 University of Architecture, Civil Engineering and Geodesy
 University of British Columbia
 University of Maribor
 University of Salento
 University of South Australia
 University of Southern California
 University of Technology Sydney
University of Tehran
 University of the Andes
 Vilnius Gediminas Technical University 
 Winston Science
 Woodside Elementary School
 Bezalel Academy of Arts and Design
Universidad de Buenos Aires - Facultad de Arquitectura Diseño y Urbanismo
 Instituto Federal de Educação, Ciência e Tecnologia de Santa Catarina - Joinville, Brazil

See also
Architectural engineering
Balsa wood bridge
Civil engineering
Physics
Problem-based learning
Statics
Truss

References

Winston Science http://www.winston-school.org/?PageName=LatestNews&Section=Highlights&ItemID=106650&ISrc=School&Itype=Highlights&SchoolID=4831

Further reading
- Estimating the weight and the failure load of a spaghetti bridge: a deep learning approach DOI:10.1080/0952813X.2019.1694590

External links

Resources

Bridges
Scale modeling